Veronika Kudermetova was the defending champion from 2019, when the tournament was last held as a WTA 125K series event, but she chose to compete in Dubai instead.

Sara Sorribes Tormo won her first WTA Tour singles title, defeating Eugenie Bouchard in the final, 6–2, 7–5.

Seeds

Draw

Finals

Top half

Bottom half

Qualifying

Seeds

Qualifiers

Lucky loser
  Harriet Dart

Draw

First qualifier

Second qualifier

Third qualifier

Fourth qualifier

Fifth qualifier

Sixth qualifier

References

External links
Main Draw
Qualifying Draw

2021 Abierto Zapopan - 1
Abierto Zapopan - 1
Mex